Sahebrao Patil Dongaonkar is an Indian politician, elected to the Lok Sabha, the lower house of the Parliament of India as a member of the Indian National Congress.

References

External links
Official biographical sketch in Parliament of India website

India MPs 1984–1989
Lok Sabha members from Maharashtra
Indian National Congress politicians
Indian Congress (Socialist) politicians
1948 births
Living people